John Francis Carr (born December 25, 1944) is an American science fiction editor and writer as well as the executor of the literary estate of H. Beam Piper.

Career
Carr was born in Philadelphia, Pennsylvania, and raised in San Diego, California.

He is the author of seven published novels and, along with co-editor Jerry Pournelle, he has edited over twenty theme anthologies and short story collections. He  is also an authority on the life and works of H. Beam Piper and his biography H. Beam Piper: A Biography, was published in 2008. His other works include the space opera The Ophidian Conspiracy and several novels (some co-written with Roland J. Green) set in the Paratime universe of H. Beam Piper).

He is also recognized as an editor, having edited numerous collections or series involving Libertarian science fiction and Military science fiction. He is best known for working with Jerry Pournelle. In 2002, Carr and Pournelle were honored with a Prometheus Award for editing The Survival of Freedom.

Published works

Novels
 The Ophidian Conspiracy (1976), re-released in 2016 as an e-book
 Pain Gain (1977)
 Carnifex Mardi Gras (1982)
 Time Crime (2010)
 Rainbow Run (2012) with Camden Benares
 The Crying Clown Celebration: A Certain Flair for Death (2013) with Camden Benares
 The Merlin Binary (2014) with Dietmar Wehr

Continuation of works by H. Beam Piper

Lord Kalvan of Otherwhen
 Great Kings' War (1985) with Roland J. Green
 Kalvan Kingmaker (2000)
 Siege of Tarr-Hostigos (2003)
 The Fireseed Wars (2009)
 The Hos Blethan Affair (2014) with Wolfgang Diehr
 Gunpowder God (2016)
 Down Styphon (2016)

Space Viking
 The Last Space Viking (2011) with Mike Robertson
 Space Viking's Throne (2012) with Mike Robertson

Little Fuzzy
 The Fuzzy Cunundrum (2016) with Wolfgang Diehr

Short fiction series
 Horseclans Universe
 Friends of the Horseclans
 Nightfriend (1987) with Roland J. Green
 Dirt Brother (1989) with Roland J. Green

Short-fiction
 Dance of the Dwarfs (1982)
 Rate of Exchange (1988) with Roland J. Green

Non-fiction
 H. Beam Piper: A Biography (2008)
 Typewriter Killer (2015) A second volume of H. Beam Piper biography.

Anthology series

Nebula Awards
 Nebula Award Stories Sixteen (1982) with Jerry Pournelle

There Will Be War
 1 There Will Be War (1983) with Jerry Pournelle
 3 Blood and Iron (1984) with Jerry Pournelle [only as by John F. Carr and J. E. Pournelle
 7 Call to Battle (1988) with Jerry Pournelle
 8 Armageddon! (1989) with Jerry Pournelle

The Endless Frontier
 2 The Endless Frontier Vol. II (1982) with Jerry Pournelle
 3 Cities in Space (1991) with Jerry Pournelle
 4 Life Among the Asteroids (1992) with Jerry Pournelle

Imperial Stars
 1 The Stars At War (1986) with Jerry Pournelle
 2 Republic and Empire (1987) with Jerry Pournelle
 3 The Crash of Empire (1989) with Jerry Pournelle

War World
 1 The Burning Eye (1988) with Jerry Pournelle and Roland Green, re-released, with additional material, in 2015 as an e-book.
 2 Death's Head Rebellion (1990) with Jerry Pournelle and Roland Green
 3 Sauron Dominion (1991) with Jerry Pournelle
 4 Invasion (1994) with Jerry Pournelle
 Codominium: Revolt on War World (1992) with Jerry Pournelle
 War World: Blood Feuds (1993) with Jerry Pournelle
 War World: Blood Vengeance (1993) with Jerry Pournelle
 War World: The Battle of Sauron (2007)
 War World: Discovery (2010)
 War World: Takeover (2011)
 War World: The Lidless Eye (2013)
 War World: Cyborg Revolt (2013)
 War World: Jihad! (2013)
 War World: The Patriotic Wars (2016)

Anthologies
 The Survival of Freedom (1981) with Jerry Pournelle
 The Science Fiction Yearbook (1985) with Jerry Pournelle and James P. Baen

Essays
 Letter (Locus #216) (1978)
 Introduction (Empire) (1981)
 Introduction (Paratime) (1981)
 Introduction (Federation) (1981)
 Shapes of Things to Come (1982)
 Introduction (The Worlds of H. Beam Piper) (1983)
 Introduction (Uller Uprising) (1983)
 Letter (Locus #312) (1987)
 State of the Art: The Last Cavalier: H. Beam Piper (1988)
 Dramatis Personae (Great Kings' War) (2006) with Roland J. Green
 Introduction (Cosmic Computer) (2014)

Essay series
 Terro-Human
 Terro-Human Future History Chronology (1981)

Carr's Pequod Press released Fuzzy Ergo Sum (2011) and "Caveat Fuzzy" (2012) by Wolfgang Diehr.  These novels pick up where the original series by H. Beam Piper  left off, continuing the story of Little Fuzzy and his fuzzy and human companions.

References
 The Encyclopedia of Science Fiction page 198

External links
 
 Carr's personal site.
  Carr's manuscript collection at St. Bonaventure University has a comprehensive list of his work, though it isn't always completely up to date.
 H. Beam Piper Memorial Site created by John F. Carr and Dennis Frank to help preserve the memory of science fiction writer H. Beam Piper.
 
 

1944 births
Living people
20th-century American novelists
21st-century American novelists
American book editors
American libertarians
American male novelists
American science fiction writers
American male short story writers
20th-century American short story writers
21st-century American short story writers
20th-century American male writers
21st-century American male writers